Sweden, Texas is a ghost town in Duval County, Texas, four miles southwest of Benavides off of Farm-to-Market Road 359. The post office first opened in 1884, but closed the next year. It reopened in 1907, but closed permanently in 1932. The population peaked at 25 in 1914, but continued to drop until no more citizens resided there. The town's school was consolidated into the Benavides Independent School District in the 1950s.

References

Ghost towns in South Texas
Geography of Duval County, Texas
Swedish-American culture in Texas